Charlie Green is the debut album of English child swing singer Charlie Green. The album was released under Star Records in autumn 2008.

Track listing

References

2008 debut albums
Charlie Green (singer) albums
Covers albums
Star Music albums